K'ank'awi (Aymara k'ank'a opening, gap; crevice, -wi a nominalizing suffix to indicate a place, "a place of crevices", hispanicized spelling Cancave) is a mountain in the Andes of southern Peru, about  high . It is located in the Tacna Region, Candarave Province, Candarave District. K'ank'awi lies southwest of Larqanku and Jisk'a Larqanku.

References

Mountains of Peru
Mountains of Tacna Region